This is a complete episode listing for the anime series Fushigi Yûgi. Directed by Hajime Kamegaki, the fifty-two episode series was produced by Studio Pierrot.  It is based on the first fourteen volumes of the Fushigi Yûgi manga series written and illustrated by Yuu Watase. The series premiered on TV Tokyo and on the satellite channel Animax on April 6, 1995 and concluded on March 28, 1996.  The series was followed by three original video animation (OVA) releases.  The first three-episode OVA, released October 25, 1996, was not based on the manga, but was purely an anime creation.  The second OVA is based on the final four volumes of the manga series.  Spanning six episodes, the series was released as two three-episode volumes, with the first released on May 25, 1997, and the second coming over a year later on August 25, 1998. The final OVA, titled Fushigi Yûgi: Eikoden, is based on two related light novels written by Megumi Nishizaki. Released on December 21, 2001, the series spans four episodes.

The entire Fushigi Yûgi anime series, including the three OVAs, were licensed for Region 1 release by Geneon Entertainment. The series was released under the expanded title Fushigi Yûgi: The Mysterious Play.  The TV series was released in eight individual volumes that contained 6–7 episodes each.  It was also released in two collectible box sets, with season one contained in the Suzaku set and season two named the Seiryu set. The first two OVAs were released together in a set titled Fushigi Yûgi: The Mysterious Play, while Fushigi Yûgi: Eikoden was released as a single disc volume.  The two box sets and the two OVAs were released with similar packaging, to give them a consistent look.  All four of these sets were taken out-of-print and no longer available.  With the closure of Geneon USA, the individual volumes may now also be out-of-print. On their Facebook page, the company Media Blasters announced that they have rescued the TV series and will release the first season in April 2012.

Fushigi Yûgi uses three pieces of theme music. All fifty-two episodes feature the song , performed by Akemi Satō, as the opening sequence theme. Yukari Konno's  is used as the series closing theme, except for episode thirty-three which uses , performed by Chika Sakamoto, is used as a memorial sequence for Nuriko.  For the final episode, the regular ending theme is used along with the opening theme "Itōshī Hito no Tame ni."

The episodes are summarized, below, using in-universe tone.

Episodes

Season 1: 1995

Season 2: 1995–1996

Original video animations

OVA 1
The first Fushigi Yûgi original video animation, OVA 1, was directed by Hajime Kamegaki and is set one year after the end of the main series. The OVA was released by Bandai Visual as a single disc volume in Japan on October 25, 1996. It was re-released in Japan on August 25, 2002.

Geneon Entertainment, which licensed the entire Fushigi Yûgi anime series for Region 1 release, combined this OVA with OVA 2 into a single box set titled Fushigi Yûgi: The Mysterious Play OVA.  Released June 5, 2001, the two-disc set included English and Japanese language tracks, and English subtitle track, an image gallery, and a color booklet with an episode list, character images, and the credits for the Japanese cast and crew. Geneon's English dub version of the series premiered on the International Channel on December 30, 2003/ The Fushigi Yûgi: The Mysterious Play OVA set is now out of print.

OVA 2
The second Fushigi Yûgi original video animation, OVA 2, was directed by Hajime Kamegaki.
Star by Akemi Satō (OP)
 by The SHE (ED)

Fushigi Yûgi: Eikoden
Fushigi Yûgi: Eikoden was originally released on four single episode DVDs starting on December 21, 2001, and with a new episode released every two months.  Geneon USA owned the license for the Region 1 release of the series, and put them together into a single volume named Fushigi Yûgi: Eikoden that was released on November 11, 2002.  This release is now out of print.

Yoko Ueno's song  is used for the series opening theme in all episodes, as well as for the ending theme in the last episode. The first three episodes use , performed by Takehito Koyasu, for their closing theme.

References
General episode information

Specific

Fushigi Yugi